And They're Off! (also known as And They're Off!... for Sport Relief) is a British television programme hosted by Ore Oduba with commentary from Dave Lamb and demonstrations from Daryll Neita and is shown on BBC One, featuring contestants predicting which celebrity will win a physical challenge to raise money for Sport Relief. The show features contestants in the BBC Pacific Quay studio answering questions to bet on which celebrity will win in a physical challenge. If their celebrity loses, they go home. The winner wins a prize donated to Sport Relief, for example: Cirque du Soleil tickets.

Format
There are five contestants. To start, they are given a series of questions. If they answer correctly, they get to choose which celebrity they think will win a physical challenge. If their celebrity loses, both the contestant and the celebrity leave. This repeats with different challenges until the final.

In the final, all 5 celebrities return for a final challenge. The remaining contestant must answer four questions and for every question they get correct, they can choose another celebrity they think will win. If one of the celebrities they choose wins, the contestant wins a prize.

Episodes

References

External links
 
 
 And They're Off! @ UKGameshows.com

2010s British sports television series
2010s British game shows
2018 British television series debuts
2018 British television series endings
BBC television game shows
BBC Television shows
Charity fundraisers
English-language television shows
Sport Relief
Television series by STV Studios